Lemna is a genus of free-floating aquatic plants referred to by the common name "duckweed". They are morphologically divergent members of the arum family Araceae. These rapidly growing plants have found uses as a model system for studies in community ecology, basic plant biology, ecotoxicology, and production of biopharmaceuticals, and as a source of animal feeds for agriculture and aquaculture. Currently, 14 species of Lemna are recognised.

Taxonomy
These duckweeds were previously placed in a separate flowering plant family, the Lemnaceae, but they 
are now considered to be members of the Araceae.

Description
Lemna species grow as simple free-floating thalli on or just beneath the water surface. Most are small, not exceeding 5 mm in length, except Lemna trisulca, which is elongated and has a branched structure. Lemna thalli  have a single root, which distinguishes this genus from the related genera Wolffia (lacks roots), Spirodela and Landoltia (have multiple roots).

The plants grow mainly by vegetative reproduction: two daughter plants bud off from the adult plant. This form of growth allows very rapid colonisation of new water. Duckweeds are flowering plants, and nearly all of them are known to reproduce sexually, flowering and producing seed under appropriate conditions. Certain duckweeds (such as L. gibba) are long-day plants, while others (such as L. minor) are short-day plants.

When Lemna invades a waterway, it can be removed mechanically, by the addition of herbivorous fish (e.g. grass carp), or, inadvisedly, treated with a herbicide.

The rapid growth of duckweeds finds application in bioremediation of polluted waters, in municipal wastewater treatment  and as test organisms for environmental studies. It is also being used as an expression system for economical production of complex biopharmaceuticals.

Duckweed meal (dried duckweed) is a good cattle feed. It contains 25–45% protein (depending on the growth conditions), 4.4% fat, and 8–10% fibre, measured by dry weight.

As a bioassay
Organisation for Economic Co-operation and Development and U.S. Environmental Protection Agency (US EPA) guidelines describe toxicity testing using L. gibba or L. minor as test organisms. Both of these species have been studied extensively for use in phytotoxicity tests.  Genetic variability in responses to toxicants can occur in Lemna, and data are insufficient to recommend a specific clone for testing. The US EPA test uses aseptic technique.  The OECD test is not conducted axenically, but steps are taken at stages during the test procedure to keep contamination by other organisms to a minimum. Depending on the objectives of the test and the regulatory requirements, testing may be performed with renewal (semistatic and flow-through) or without renewal (static) of the test solution. Renewal is useful for substances that are rapidly lost from solution as a result of volatilisation, photodegradation, precipitation, or biodegradation.

Production of biopharmaceuticals
Lemna has been transformed by molecular biologists to express proteins of pharmaceutical interest.  Expression constructs were engineered to cause Lemna to secrete the transformed proteins into the growth medium at high yield.  Since the Lemna is grown on a simple medium, this substantially reduces the burden of protein purification in preparing such proteins for medical use, promising substantial reductions in manufacturing costs.  In addition, the host Lemna can be engineered to cause secretion of proteins with human patterns of glycosylation, an improvement over conventional plant gene-expression systems.  Several such products are being developed, including monoclonal antibodies.

Duckweed farming
High yields of duckweed with a high protein content for use in human nutrition, animal and fish feed can be achieved by careful control of growth conditions. The acceptable pH range is 5 to 9, but better growth is obtained in the pH range of 6.5 to 7.5. High nitrogen levels, for example 20 mM urea, have provided a protein content in the range of 45% by weight. The water may typically contain 60 mg/L of soluble nitrogen and 1 mg/L of phosphorus. Fertiliser is required on a daily basis for optimal growth.

Duckweed can be farmed organically, with nutrients being supplied from a variety of sources, for example human urine, cattle manure, pig waste, biogas plant slurry, or other organic matter in slurry form. Because of the rapid growth of duckweed, daily harvesting is necessary to achieve optimal yields. Harvesting is done such that less than 1 kg/m2 of duckweed remains. Under optimal conditions, a duckweed farm can produce 10 to 30 tons of dried duckweed per hectare per year.

Species
Infrageneric classification following Les et al. 2002.
Section Alatae
Lemna aequinoctialis Welw. – lesser duckweed – tropical and subtropical
Lemna perpusilla Torr. – minute duckweed – eastern United States, Quebec
Section Biformes
Lemna tenera Kurz – Indochina, Sumatra, Northern Territory of Australia
Section Lemna
Lemna disperma Hegelm.
Lemna ecuadoriensis Landolt
Lemna gibba L. – gibbous duckweed – widespread
Lemna japonica Landolt – Japan, China, Korea, Russian Far East
Lemna minor L. – common duckweed – cosmopolitan
Lemna obscura (Austin) Daubs – United States, Mexico, Bahamas, Colombia, Ecuador
Lemna trisulca L. – ivy duckweed – cosmopolitan
Lemna turionifera Landolt – temperate Europe, Asia, North America
Section Uninerves
Lemna minuta Kunth – least duckweed – North + South America
Lemna valdiviana Phil. – Valdivia duckweed – North  and South America
Lemna yungensis Landolt – Bolivia

Formerly placed here
Landoltia punctata (G.Mey.) Les & D.J.Crawford (as L. oligorrhiza Kurz and L. punctata G.Mey.)
Spirodela polyrhiza (L.) Schleid. (as L. polyrhiza L.)
Wolffia arrhiza (L.) Horkel ex Wimm. (as L. arrhiza L.)
Wolffia globosa (Roxb.) Hartog & Plas (as L. globosa Roxb.)

References

General readings
Cross, J.W. (2006). The Charms of Duckweed. 
Landolt, E. (1986) Biosystematic investigations in the family of duckweeds (Lemnaceae). Vol. 2. The family of Lemnaceae – A monographic study. Part 1 of the monograph: Morphology; karyology; ecology; geographic distribution; systematic position; nomenclature; descriptions. Veröff. Geobot. Inst., Stiftung Rübel, ETH, Zurich.

External links
Lemna Ecotox testing Duckweed growth inhibition tests and standardisation
OECD Guideline for Lemna Test 
USDA Plants Profile: North American Species
Jepson Manual Treatment: Lemna

Lemnoideae
Araceae genera
Aquatic plants